Another Smash!!!  is the third studio album by the Ventures, released in 1961 on Dolton Records.

Reception
This album entered the Billboard Top LPs chart on June 26, 1961, and remained on the chart for fourteen weeks, peaking at number 39.

Track listing
 "(Ghost) Riders in the Sky" (Stan Jones) – 2:28 
 "Wheels" (Jimmy Torres, Richard Stephens) – 1:55
 "Lonely Heart" (Bob Bogle, Don Wilson) – 2:10
 "Bulldog" (George Tomsco) – 2:20
 "Lullaby of the Leaves" (Bernice Petkere, Joe Young) – 1:58
 "Beyond the Reef" (Jack Pitman) – 3:05
 "Raw-Hide" (Mark Grant, Link Wray) – 2:29
 "Meet Mister Callahan" (Eric Spear) – 2:20
 "Trambone" (Chet Atkins) – 2:04
 "Last Date" (Floyd Cramer) – 2:13
 "Ginchy" (Bert Weedon) – 1:40
 "Josie" (Bogle, Wilson) – 2:04

Personnel
Don Wilson – rhythm guitar and lead guitar (lead on track 1)
Nokie Edwards – bass guitar, lead guitar (lead on track 7)
Bob Bogle – bass guitar, lead guitar (lead on all other tracks)
Howie Johnson – drums

References

1961 albums
Dolton Records albums
The Ventures albums
Instrumental albums